The 2021 Women's U-19 European Handball Championship was the 13th edition of the European Women's U-19 Handball Championship, and was held in Celje, Slovenia from 8 to 18 July 2021.

Qualification

Draw
The draw was held on 10 February 2021 in Vienna.

Preliminary round
All times are local (UTC+2).

Group A

Group B

Group C

 The game was originally supposed to be played on 8 July 2021.

Group D

Intermediate round

Group III

Group IV

Main round

Group I

Group II

Final round

Bracket

Championship bracket

Ninth place bracket

Fifth place bracket

13th place bracket

13–15th place semifinal

9–12th place semifinals

5–8th place semifinals

Semifinals

13th place game

Eleventh place game

Ninth place game

Seventh place game

Fifth place game

Third place game

Final

Final ranking and awards

Final ranking

All Star Team 
The All Star Team and awards were announced on 18 July 2021.

Statistics

Top goalscorers

References

External links 
 Official website
 EHF

European Women's U-19 Handball Championship
European U-19 Handball Championship
2021 European Women's U-19
European U-19 Handball Championship
2021 European Women's U-19 Handball Championship
2021 in Slovenian women's sport
European Handball Championship